WKOR-FM (94.9 FM, "94.9 Nash FM") is a country music formatted radio station based in Columbus, Mississippi. WKOR is owned by Cumulus Licensing LLC. WKOR serves East Central Mississippi and parts of West Central Alabama with an ERP of 50,000 watts. Cities in the primary coverage area are Columbus, West Point and Starkville, Mississippi.

History

After several years in the AOR & Top 40 formats, respectively, WKOR-FM would change to the popular Hot Country format. The station would also change its frequency from 92.1 to 94.9 and relocate its studios to downtown Columbus and be rebranded as K94.9 under the initial guidance of Rusty Walker Programming.  
Other on-air talent for K94.9 would include Jodi Roberts, Larry Bond, Dave Richards, Kelli Karlson, Mike Grace, Dalton Middleton, Joel Sargent, Kevin Burchfield, Bill Thurlow, Nikki Steele, and Scotty D.

 On February 3, 2014 WKOR-FM along with 9 other Cumulus owned country music stations, made the switch to going under the Nash FM branding.

References

External links

KOR
Country radio stations in the United States
Cumulus Media radio stations
1993 establishments in Mississippi
Radio stations established in 1993
Columbus, Mississippi